Brandon Xavier Huntley-Hatfield (born August 6, 2003) is an American college basketball player for the University of Louisville Cardinals of the Atlantic Coast Conference (ACC).

High school career
Huntley-Hatfield first played high school basketball for Clarksville Academy in Clarksville, Tennessee, where he averaged 11.4 points and six rebounds per game as a freshman. For his next two years, he transferred to IMG Academy in Bradenton, Florida. He played his final season at Scotland Campus in Scotland, Pennsylvania.

Recruiting
Huntley-Hatfield was considered a five-star recruit by 247Sports and ESPN, and a four-star recruit by Rivals. On April 15, 2021, he reclassified to the 2021 class and committed to playing college basketball for Tennessee over offers from Ole Miss, Syracuse, Wake Forest, Auburn and Kansas.

References

External links
Tennessee Volunteers bio
USA Basketball bio

2003 births
Living people
American men's basketball players
Basketball players from Tennessee
IMG Academy alumni
People from Clarksville, Tennessee
Power forwards (basketball)
Tennessee Volunteers basketball players